Hofstade can refer to:

 Hofstade (East Flanders), a sub-municipality of the city of Aalst, Belgium
 Hofstade (Flemish Brabant), a sub-municipality of Zemst, Belgium

de:Aalst#Hofstade